Hoàng Thị Loan (黃氏鸞, 1868–1901) was the mother of Nguyen Sinh Cung, later known as Ho Chi Minh, former President of Democratic Republic of Vietnam. Hoang Thi Loan was born in the Hoang Tru village of the Nam Dan district in 1868. She was the second daughter of Hoang Duong, a well-educated village native. Loan married Nguyen Sinh Sac and birthed three children, Nguyen Sinh Cung, Nguyen Sinh Khiem, and Nguyen Thi Thanh. Hoang Thi Loan died of disease in 1901, only six years after her family moved to the royal capital of Huế.

In 1922 her grave was moved to Sen village by Nguyễn Thị Thanh, Ho Chi Minh's older sister. Her grave was moved again in 1942 by Nguyễn Sinh Khiêm to the Dong Tranh mountain in fear of government reprisal during the Việt Minh revolutionary movement.

In 1985 a tomb honoring Hoang Thi Loan was erected in commemoration of the date of Ho Chi Minh's 95th birthday. The Tomb of Mrs. Hoang Thi Loan is located on Mount Dong Tranh, in the Nam Đàn District of the Nghệ An Province. In 2005 work was completed on a four-year, 309 billion VND project that included renovation of Loan's grave and the completion of her tomb.

References

Further reading
Duiker, William.  Chapter 1.  Ho Chi Minh. Hyperion, 2000.  .

19th-century Vietnamese women
1868 births
1901 deaths

vi:Gia đình Hồ Chí Minh#Hoàng Thị Loan